Bowari Khongstia (born 19 January 1993) is an Indian professional footballer who plays as a defender for Royal Wahingdoh F.C. in the I-League.

Career
Born in Shillong, Meghalaya, Khongstia has been a part of Royal Wahingdoh since 2011.

Khongstia made his professional debut for Royal Wahingdoh in the I-League on 22 April 2015 against Dempo. He came on as a 75th-minute substitute for Reagan Singh as Royal Wahingdoh lost 3–2.

Career statistics

References

1993 births
Living people
People from Shillong
Indian footballers
Royal Wahingdoh FC players
Association football defenders
Footballers from Meghalaya
I-League 2nd Division players
I-League players